There are several origins of the name, among them the shortened forms of German occupational names like "Fassbinder" or "Buchbinder" (i.e. Bookbinder). Also an old English name relating to Binders that bound barrels made by Coopers. Binder also has origins in Indian and Jewish culture.

Notable people surnamed Binder
Abraham Binder (1895–1966), American composer
Brad Binder (born 1995), South African motorcycle racer
Charles A. Binder (1857–1891), New York politician
Claudia Kristofics-Binder (born 1961), Austrian figure skater
Darryn Binder (born 1998), South African motorcycle racer
David Binder (1931–2019), British-born American journalist 
Eando Binder, pseudonym used by American writing duo Earl Andrew Binder (1904–1965) and Otto Binder (1911–1974)
Elisabeth Binder, doctor and neuroscientist
Franz Binder (1911–1989), Austrian football (soccer) player and trainer
Hans Binder (born 1948), Austrian Formula One driver
Herbert Binder (born 1932), Swiss sport shooter
Julius Binder (1870–1939), German jurist
Karin Binder (born 1957), German politician
Károly Binder, Hungarian jazz pianist
Maurice Binder (1925–1991), American film technician
Max Binder (born 1947), Swiss politician
Mike Binder (born 1958), American film director, writer and actor
Otto Binder (1911-1974), American writer
Paul Binder (1902–1981), German politician (CDU)
René Binder (born 1992), Austrian racing driver
Sebastian Binder (1792–1845), Austrian opera singer
Stefan Binder (born 1978), German football (soccer) player
Tom Binder (1889–1969), English professional footballer who played for Southampton in the 1910s

See also
Raj Binder, a character played by Shaun Majumder
Pinder (disambiguation)
Fassbinder

surnames